Lombers is a commune in the Tarn department in southern France.

History
Lombers was the significant centre of Catharism in the late 12th and early 13th centuries. It was the location of a Catholic-Cathar debate, perhaps in the 1180s, between Guillaume Peyre de Brens, Catholic bishop of Albi, and Sicard le Cellerier, Cathar bishop of Albi; Sicard lived at Lombers.

Geography
The commune is traversed by the river Assou.

See also
Communes of the Tarn department

References

Communes of Tarn (department)